Albert Edward Johnstone (7 September 1878 – 23 July 1918) was a South African sports shooter. He competed in three events at the 1912 Summer Olympics.

References

External links
 

1878 births
1918 deaths
South African male sport shooters
Olympic shooters of South Africa
Shooters at the 1912 Summer Olympics
Sportspeople from Pietermaritzburg